Sialic acid-binding Ig-like lectin 5 is a protein that in humans is encoded by the SIGLEC5 gene. SIGLEC5 has also been designated CD170 (cluster of differentiation 170).

References

Further reading

External links 
 PDBe-KB provides an overview of all the structure information available in the PDB for Human Sialic acid-binding Ig-like lectin 5 (SIGLEC5)

Clusters of differentiation
SIGLEC